Toveyleh or Tavileh may refer to various places in Iran:

East Azerbaijan Province
 Tavileh-ye Shami, Ahar County

Kermanshah Province
 Tavileh-ye Olya, Kermanshah County
 Tavileh-ye Sofla, Kermanshah County

Khuzestan Province
 Toveyleh-ye Bozorg, Ahvaz County
 Toveyleh-ye Kuchek, Ahvaz County
 Toveyleh-ye Seyyed Taher, Ahvaz County
 Toveyleh-ye Yebareh, Ahvaz County
 Tavileh, Andika
 Tavileh 1, Hoveyzeh County
 Tavileh 2, Hoveyzeh County